Meghna is an upazila in Comilla District. In the end of 1998, Meghna was declared as the upazila. This upazila was formed with 5 unions of Daudkandi upazila and 3 unions of Homna upazila. As the Meghna river flows on one side of this upazila, is named after the proposal of the name of Meghna.

Geographical location 
Araihazar upazila on the north, Sonargaon on the west, Gazaria and Daudkandi on the south and Homna and Titas upazilas on the east.

Demographics

According to the 2011 Census of Bangladesh, Meghna upazila had a population of 112,453 living in 21,617 households. Its growth rate over the decade 2001-2011 was 15.97%. Meghna has a sex ratio of 992 females per 1000 males and a literacy rate of 44.61%. 6,159 (5.48%) live in urban areas.

Economics 
This is an agrarian area. Farmers and fisheries are the main sources of income. Many are working as migrant Bangladeshi.

Administration
Meghna Upazila is divided into eight union parishads: Barakanda, Chandanpur, Chalibanga, Govindapur, Luter Char, Manikar Char, Radhanagar, and Vaorkhola. The union parishads are subdivided into 38 mauzas and 102 villages.

Education 
Literacy and educational institutions Average literacy 33.34%; Male 38.04%, female 29.92%. Educational institutions: college 2, secondary school 7, primary school 51, community primary school 1, madrasa 2.

Infrastructure 
 Government hospitals: 2 (Meghna Upazila Health complex & Luter char Union Health complex), medical clinic: 4
 Hat Bazaar: 17
 Post office: 5

See also 
Upazilas of Bangladesh
Districts of Bangladesh
Divisions of Bangladesh

References 

 
Upazilas of Comilla District